Baba Kharak Singh (6 June 1867 — 6 October 1963) was an Indian playwright born at Sialkot in British India. He was involved in the Indian independence movement and was president of the Central Sikh League.

He was a Sikh political leader and virtually the first president of the Shiromani Gurdwara Parbandhak Committee. He was among the first batch of students who graduated (1889) from Punjab University, Lahore. His father, Rai Bahadur Sardar Hari Singh, was a wealthy contractor and industrialist. Today, a prominent road, which is a radial road of Connaught Place, New Delhi towards Gurdwara Bangla Sahib, is named Baba Kharak Singh Marg, after him.

Early life
Kharak Singh, having passed his matriculation examination from Mission High School and intermediate from Murray College, both at Sialkot, after graduating from University of the Punjab, (Lahore) he joined the Law College at Allahabad, but the death of his father and elder brother in quick succession, interrupted his studies as he had to return to Sialkot to manage the family property.

He started his public life in 1912 as chairman of the reception committee of the 5th session of the Sikh Educational Conference held at Sialkot.

Three years later in 1915, as president of the 8th session of the Conference held at Tarn Taran, he surprised everyone by walking to the site of the conference, breaking the stately custom of arriving in a carriage pulled by six horses. He also refused permission for a proposed resolution to be moved at the conference wishing victory to the British in World War I.

The Jallianwala Bagh massacre of 1919 galvanised Kharak Singh as the virtual core of Sikh politics.

Political life
Kharak Singh presided over the historic session of the Central Sikh League held in Lahore in 1920 where under his direction the Sikhs took part in the Non-cooperation movement. Mahatma Gandhi, the Ali brothers and Saifuddin Kitchlew also attended the event and advised the Sikhs to throw in their lot with the Congress Party.

In 1921-22 he successfully led the first Morcha (agitation) against the British government (November, 1921), which is popularly known as the Keys Morcha. This was a Sikh protest requiring the return of the keys of the Toshakhana (treasury) of the Golden Temple, which had been seized by the British Deputy Commissioner of Amritsar. Kharak Singh was among the first to be arrested and this was the first of his numerous jail terms under the British. His arrest led to a vigorous storm of protest against the Government.

Arrest and Prison
He was jailed on 26 November 1921 for making an anti government speech, he was sentenced to six months imprisonment on 2 December 1921, but was released on 17 January 1922 when the keys of the toshakhana were also surrendered to him. In the same year he was elected President of Punjab Provincial Congress Committee.

Baba ji was, however, rearrested soon and, on 4 April 1922, he was awarded one year in jail for running a factory that manufactured kirpans (one of the religious symbols of the Sikhs): to which another three years were added, on charges of making seditious speeches.

He was sent to jail in distant Dera Gazi Khan (now a district in Pakistan Punjab), where in protest against the forced removal of the turbans of Sikh and the 'Gandhi caps' of non-Sikh political prisoners, he discarded all his clothes except his kachahira (underpants), another of the religious symbols of the Sikhs. Despite the extreme weather conditions of the place, he remained bare-backed until he was released after his full term (twice extended for non-obedience of orders) on 4 June 1927.

Struggle against British rule
He organized a mammoth demonstration in 1928 when the Simon Commission visited Lahore. Also during 1928-29, he vehemently opposed the Nehru Committee Report until the Congress Party shelved it and took action to secure the Sikhs' concurrence in the framing of constitutional proposals in the future. He was again sent to jail in 1931 but was released after six months. He was re-arrested in 1932 and served another 19 months in prison.

The Sikh opposition to the Swaraj colours articulated in as early as 1921 and took shape progressively. In 1929, a deputation of the Sikhs met Mahatma Gandhi at Lahore and made a firm demand that the Sikh colour, a shade of Yellow or black, be added to the Swaraj flag. In March 1930, when Gandhi launched Civil Disobedience Movements, Baba Kharak Singh, President of the Shiromani Gurdwara Prabandhak Committee, refused to join the movement, if the Sikh colour Saffron was not included in the flag.

He spoke out in opposition to the Communal Award, which gave a statutory majority to Muslims in the Punjab, and was in and out of jail on several occasions for making speeches that the British government held to be seditious. In 1935 he was, once again, taken into custody for his scathing criticism of the Communal Award.

In 1940 Babaji was again sent to the jail for participating in the Satyagrah movement, but in spite of his old age, Babaji did not stop his activities.

Demise
After the Partition of 1947, Babaji stayed in Delhi in virtual retirement from public life, dying on 6 October 1963 at the ripe age of 95.

References

Indian Sikhs
Sikh politics
People from Sialkot
1868 births
1963 deaths
Shiromani Akali Dal politicians
legend that are heart of punjab